Roland de Mecquenem was a French army officer who played an important role in the battle of Dien Bien Phu during the First Indochina War. He commanded the fifth battalion of the 7e Régiment de Tirailleurs Algériens (V/7 RTA).

During World War II, he participated in Operation Jedburgh.

References

French Army officers
Year of death missing
Year of birth missing